EK Channel is a Philippine weekly showbiz-oriented show that aired on ABS-CBN hosted by Ogie Diaz, Rica Peralejo, Angelika dela Cruz and Marvin Agustin. The show was a competitor to rival network GMA Network's Startalk. which as aired from June 19, 2004, to January 29, 2005, replacing S2: Showbiz Sabado and was replaced by Entertainment Konek.

Hosts
Ogie Diaz
Rica Peralejo
Dominic Ochoa
Angelika dela Cruz
Marvin Agustin

Guest Hosts
Toni Gonzaga
Jose Javier Reyes

See also
 List of programs broadcast by ABS-CBN

Philippine television talk shows
ABS-CBN original programming
2004 Philippine television series debuts
2005 Philippine television series endings
Entertainment news shows in the Philippines
Filipino-language television shows